Herbert Raymond McMaster (born July 24, 1962) is a retired United States Army lieutenant general who served as the 25th United States National Security Advisor from 2017 to 2018. He is also known for his roles in the Gulf War, Operation Enduring Freedom, and Operation Iraqi Freedom.

Born in Philadelphia, McMaster graduated from the United States Military Academy in 1984, and later earned a Ph.D. in American history from the University of North Carolina at Chapel Hill. His Ph.D. thesis was critical of American strategy and military leadership during the Vietnam War and served as the basis for his book Dereliction of Duty, which is widely read in the United States military. During the Gulf War, McMaster served as a captain in the 2nd Cavalry Regiment, taking part in the Battle of 73 Easting.

After the Gulf War, McMaster was a military history professor at the United States Military Academy from 1994 to 1996, became a research fellow at the Hoover Institution, a member of the Council on Foreign Relations and a Consulting Senior Fellow at the International Institute for Strategic Studies (IISS). He held a series of staff positions in the United States Central Command. In 2004, he took command of the 3rd Cavalry Regiment and fought the Iraqi insurgency in Tal Afar. He became a top counterinsurgency advisor to General David Petraeus before serving as the Director of the Army Capabilities Integration Center. He also served as the Deputy to the Commander for Planning of the International Security Assistance Force in Afghanistan and, in 2014, became Deputy Commanding General of the Army Training and Doctrine Command.

In February 2017, McMaster succeeded Michael Flynn as President Donald Trump's National Security Advisor. He remained on active duty as a lieutenant general while serving as National Security Advisor, and retired in May 2018. McMaster resigned as National Security Advisor on March 22, 2018, effective April 9, and accepted an academic appointment to Stanford University in 2018.

McMaster is the Fouad and Michelle Ajami Senior Fellow at the Hoover Institution, the Bernard and Susan Liautaud Visiting Fellow at the Freeman Spogli Institute for International Studies and a lecturer in management at the Stanford Graduate School of Business.

Early life 
McMaster was born in Philadelphia on July 24, 1962. His father, Herbert McMaster Sr., was a veteran of the Korean War who retired from the Army as a lieutenant colonel of Infantry. His mother, Marie C. "Mimi" McMaster (née Curcio), was a school teacher and administrator. He has a younger sister, Letitia. He attended Norwood Fontbonne Academy, graduating in 1976; and high school at Valley Forge Military Academy, graduating in 1980. He earned a commission as a second lieutenant upon graduating from the United States Military Academy at West Point in 1984.

McMaster earned a Master of Arts and Ph.D. in American history from the University of North Carolina at Chapel Hill (UNC). His thesis was critical of American strategy in the Vietnam War, which was further detailed in his book Dereliction of Duty (1997). The book explores the military's role in the policies of the Vietnam War. It harshly criticized high-ranking officers of the era, arguing that they inadequately challenged Secretary of Defense Robert McNamara and President Lyndon B. Johnson on their Vietnam strategy. The book examines McNamara and Johnson's staff alongside the Joint Chiefs of Staff and other high-ranking military officers, and their failure to provide a successful plan of action either to pacify a Viet Cong insurgency or to decisively defeat the North Vietnamese Army. McMaster also details why military actions intended to indicate "resolve" or to "communicate" ultimately failed when trying to accomplish sparsely detailed, confusing, and conflicting military objectives. The book was reportedly much read in Pentagon circles and included in military reading lists.

Military career

McMaster's first assignment after commissioning was to the 2nd Armored Division at Fort Hood, where he served in a variety of platoon and company-level leadership assignments with 1st Battalion 66th Armor Regiment. In 1989, he was assigned to the 2nd Armored Cavalry Regiment at Warner Barracks in Bamberg, Germany, where he served until 1992, including deployment to Operation Desert Storm.

During the Gulf War in 1991 McMaster was a captain commanding Eagle Troop of the 2nd Armored Cavalry Regiment at the Battle of 73 Easting. During that battle, though significantly outnumbered and encountering the enemy by surprise as McMaster's lead tank crested a dip in the terrain, the nine tanks of his troop destroyed 28 Iraqi Republican Guard tanks without loss in 23 minutes.

McMaster was awarded the Silver Star. The now famous battle is featured in several books about Operation Desert Storm and is widely referred to in US Army training exercises. It was also discussed in Tom Clancy's 1994 popular nonfiction book Armored Cav.

McMaster served as a military history professor at West Point from 1994 to 1996, teaching among other things the battles in which he fought. He graduated from the United States Army Command and General Staff College in 1999.

McMaster commanded 1st Squadron, 4th Cavalry Regiment from 1999 to 2002, and then took a series of staff positions at U.S. Central Command (USCENTCOM), including planning and operations roles in Iraq.

In his next job, as lieutenant colonel and later colonel, McMaster worked on the staff of USCENTCOM as executive officer to Deputy Commander Lieutenant General John Abizaid. When Abizaid received four-star rank and became Central Command's head, McMaster served as Director, Commander's Advisory Group (CAG), described as the command's brain trust.

In 2003 McMaster completed an Army War College research fellowship at Stanford University's Hoover Institution. In 2004, he was assigned to command the 3rd Armored Cavalry Regiment (3rd ACR). Shortly after McMaster took command the regiment deployed for its second tour in Iraq and was assigned the mission of securing the city of Tal Afar. That mission culminated in September with Operation Restoring Rights and the defeat of the city's insurgent strongholds. President George W. Bush praised this success, and the PBS show Frontline broadcast a documentary in February 2006 featuring interviews with McMaster. CBS's 60 Minutes produced a similar segment in July, and the operation was the subject of an article in the April 10, 2006, issue of The New Yorker.

Author Tim Harford has written that the pioneering tactics employed by 3rd ACR led to the first success in overcoming the Iraqi insurgency. Before 2005, tactics included staying out of dangerous urban areas except on patrols, with US forces returning to their bases each night. These patrols had little success in turning back the insurgency because local Iraqis who feared retaliation would very rarely assist in identifying them to US forces. McMaster deployed his soldiers into Tal Afar on a permanent basis, and once the local population grew confident that they weren't going to withdraw nightly, the citizens began providing information on the insurgents, enabling US forces to target and defeat them. After hearing of McMaster's counterinsurgency success in Tal Afar, Vice President Dick Cheney invited McMaster to personally brief him on the situation in Iraq and give an assessment on what changes needed to be made to American strategy.

McMaster passed command of the 3rd ACR on June 29, 2006, and joined the International Institute for Strategic Studies in London, as a Senior Research Associate tasked to "conduct research to identify opportunities for improved multi-national cooperation and political-military integration in the areas of counterinsurgency, counter-terrorism, and state building", and to devise "better tactics to battle terrorism."

From August 2007 to August 2008, McMaster was part of an "elite team of officers advising U.S. commander" General David Petraeus on counterinsurgency operations while Petraeus directed revision of the Army's Counterinsurgency Field Manual during his command of the Combined Arms Center. Petraeus and most of his team were stationed in Fort Leavenworth at the time but McMaster collaborated remotely, according to senior team member John Nagl.

Based on his date of rank as a colonel, McMaster was considered for promotion to brigadier general by annual Department of the Army selection boards in 2006 and 2007 but was not selected, despite his reputation as one of "the most celebrated soldiers of the Iraq War." Though the Army's rationale for whether a given officer is selected is not made public, McMaster's initial non-selection attracted considerable media attention. In late 2007, Secretary of the Army Pete Geren requested that Petraeus return from Iraq to take charge of the promotion board as a way to ensure that the best performers in combat received every consideration for advancement, resulting in McMaster's selection along with other colonels who had been identified as innovative thinkers.

In August 2008, McMaster assumed duties as Director, Concept Development and Experimentation (later renamed Concept Development and Learning), in the Army Capabilities Integration Center (ARCIC) at Fort Monroe, Virginia, part of U.S. Army Training and Doctrine Command. In this position he was involved in preparing doctrine to guide the Army over the next 10 to 20 years. He was promoted on June 29, 2009. Of the 978 members of the West Point Class of 1984 commissioned into the U.S. Army, McMaster was the second promoted to General Officer. In July 2010 he was selected to be the J-5, Deputy to the Commander for Planning, at ISAF (International Security Assistance Forces) Headquarters in Kabul, Afghanistan.

McMaster was nominated for major general on January 23, 2012, and selected to be the commander of the Army's Maneuver Center of Excellence at Fort Benning. In February 2014, Defense Secretary Chuck Hagel nominated McMaster for lieutenant general and in July 2014, McMaster pinned on his third star when he began his duties as Deputy Commanding General of the U.S. Army Training and Doctrine Command and Director of TRADOC's Army Capabilities Integration Center.

Army Chief of Staff General Martin Dempsey remarked in 2011 that McMaster was "probably our best Brigadier General." McMaster made Times list of the 100 most influential people in the world in April 2014. He was hailed as "the architect of the future U.S. Army" in the accompanying piece written by retired Lt. Gen. David Barno, who commanded U.S. and allied forces in Afghanistan from 2003 to 2005. "Major General Herbert Raymond McMaster might be the 21st century Army's pre-eminent warrior-thinker," Barno wrote, commenting on McMaster's "impressive command and unconventional exploits in the second Iraq war." Barno also wrote, "Recently tapped for his third star, H.R. is also the rarest of soldiers—one who has repeatedly bucked the system and survived to join its senior ranks." In 2014, retired Army Gen. Jack Keane, a former Army vice chief, commented, "It is heartening to see the Army reward such an extraordinary general officer who is a thought leader and innovator while also demonstrating sheer brilliance as a wartime brigade commander."

McMaster requested his retirement from the Army following his March 22, 2018 resignation as President Trump's National Security Adviser, asking that he leave the service "this summer."

National Security Advisor
On February 20, 2017, U.S. President Donald Trump nominated McMaster for National Security Advisor following the resignation of Michael T. Flynn on February 13. McMaster said at the time that he intended "to remain on active duty while he serves as national security advisor."

Because McMaster intended to remain on active duty, his official assumption of the National Security Advisor's duties and responsibilities required a United States Senate vote; lieutenant generals and generals require Senate confirmation of their rank and assignments. On March 6, 2017, the Senate Armed Services Committee voted 23–2 to recommend to the full Senate that McMaster be confirmed for reappointment at his lieutenant general rank during his service as the National Security Advisor. The committee recommendation was referred to the Senate on March 7, and the full Senate confirmed McMaster by a vote of 86–10 on March 15, 2017.

In early August, McMaster was targeted by what some deemed a "smear campaign" after he fired several National Security Council staff members. White House officials and journalists suspected Steve Bannon of leading these attacks. Attorney Mike Cernovich, radio host Alex Jones and Breitbart News were among the foremost promoters of the anti-McMaster campaign; Cernovich's website for the campaign also included a cartoon depicting McMaster, which the Anti-Defamation League (ADL) labeled antisemitic. In addition, the Center for Security Policy criticized McMaster for being insufficiently conservative and for not supporting Trump's agenda. The anti-McMaster campaign prompted dismissive responses by administration officials, and a statement from Trump affirming his confidence in McMaster.

According to reports, McMaster had called Trump a "dope" in July 2017, which a spokesman for the National Security Council denied saying "Actual participants in the dinner deny that General McMaster made any of the comments attributed to him by anonymous sources. Those false comments represent the diametric opposite of General McMaster's actual views".

In February 2018, McMaster said that it was "incontrovertible" that Russia interfered in the 2016 presidential election. McMaster, who spoke a day after a federal grand jury indicted more than a dozen Russians in connection with the interference, was addressing an international audience at the Munich Security Conference, including several Russian officials.

Dismissal 
On March 15, 2018, it was reported that Trump had decided to dismiss McMaster from his position at a later, unspecified date. White House Press Secretary Sarah Huckabee Sanders denied the reports in a tweet, claiming nothing had changed at the National Security Council.

On March 22, 2018, McMaster resigned as National Security Advisor after conflicts with Trump, and disagreements with him on key foreign policy strategies, including the administration's approach to Iran, Russia, and North Korea. He said in a statement that he planned to retire from the military sometime in the next few months. According to reports, the military was resistant to promoting McMaster and granting him a follow-on assignment, while McMaster was not inclined to accept the positions that were offered.  Trump announced John Bolton, former U.S. Ambassador to the United Nations, as McMaster's replacement. McMaster's ousting closely followed the departures of several other high-ranking officials in the administration, including Trump's longtime assistant and communications director Hope Hicks, national economic advisor Gary Cohn, and Secretary of State Rex Tillerson. As with Tillerson's dismissal, Trump first announced McMaster's departure from the administration via a public tweet.

McMaster's retirement ceremony was held on May 18, 2018. It took place at Joint Base Myer–Henderson Hall, and was presided over by General Mark A. Milley, the Army Chief of Staff. Among the decorations and honors McMaster received was a third award of the Army Distinguished Service Medal.

Post-military career 
HarperCollins published McMaster's memoir, Battlegrounds: The Fight to Defend the Free World in September 2020.

Positive reviews of the book included one by Cliff May, founder and president of Foundation for Defense of Democracies (FDD), who said of the book "...with H.R.’s thoughtful, substantive, and intellectual approach. Battlegrounds lives up to this expectation, and then some. As a historian, as well as a soldier and strategist, General McMaster explores the development of the complex challenges facing America in the 21st Century." Another positive review was that of Steve Cohen, an attorney at Pollock Cohen LLP in New York and a former member of the U.S. Naval Institute Board of Directors, who said it was "...a sober, thoughtful, intelligent volume that deserves shelf space for anyone serious about U.S. foreign policy in the first part of the 21st century."

Negative reviews included one by Spencer Ackerman, who said the book "is disinterested in shedding any significant light on the Trump administration...The geopolitical perspective McMaster offers in Battlegrounds, in keeping with his year as national security adviser, pretends that Trump hasn't happened." Another negative review was that of Gregory A. Daddis, who wrote of the book, "The entire treatise is an advertisement for coercive diplomacy, yet offers little exploration of the potential consequences of constant coercion of others, and of the increased risk of war that follows."

In September 2018, McMaster began work as a Bernard and Susan Liautaud Visiting Fellow at Stanford University's Freeman Spogli Institute for International Studies. He was appointed to the Fouad and Michelle Ajami Senior Fellowship at Stanford's Hoover Institution and serves as a lecturer in management at Stanford Graduate School of Business effective September 1, 2018, as that institution had announced on July 2 that year.

McMaster is a member of the Atlantic Council's Board of Directors, and in 2019 became an Advisory Board Member of Spirit of America, a 501(c)(3) organization that supports deployed US personnel. In 2020, McMaster became a board member of Zoom Video Communications , and advisor to  Mischler Financial Group Inc.  He is Chairman of Ergo's Flashpoints Forum, a consultancy firm. In 2021, McMaster joined Shield Capital's board of Strategic Advisors  In September 2021, McMaster joined the advisory board of the geospatial-intelligence corporation Edgybees. At the end of 2021, he joined the advisory board of the artificial intelligence corporation C3 AI. In January 2022, he joined the advisory board of Strider Technologies, a software firm focused on economic statecraft risk vis-à-vis strategic competition with China.

In 2021 Lieutenant General H.R. McMaster was appointed Distinguished University Fellow at Arizona State University where he serves as a subject matter expert on national security and defense issues. Also serving as an Arizona State University guest lecturer, he guides and mentors students, and hosts special events surrounding national security and defense to advance Arizona State University’s lead in competitive statecraft.

Decorations and badges

See also

References

Further reading
 Fred Kaplan, The Insurgents: David Petraeus and the Plot to Change the American Way of War, 2013, Simon & Schuster,

External links

 "H.R. McMaster: The Warrior's-Eye View of Afghanistan", Wall Street Journal interview May 11, 2012
 Online Video of Frontline program The Insurgency, see part 4.
 Nov 2003 Crack in the Foundation: Defense Transformation and the Underlying Assumption of Dominant Knowledge in Future War, H.R. McMaster (PDF)
 Lieutenant General H.R. McMaster: Visiting Fellow Biography, at the Hoover Institution
 

1962 births
American people of Italian descent
American people of Scotch-Irish descent
American male non-fiction writers
American military historians
United States Army personnel of the Iraq War
United States Army personnel of the War in Afghanistan (2001–2021)
Living people
Military personnel from Philadelphia
Recipients of the Defense Superior Service Medal
Recipients of the Distinguished Service Medal (US Army)
Recipients of the Legion of Merit
Recipients of the Silver Star
Tank personnel
Trump administration personnel
United States Army Command and General Staff College alumni
United States Army generals
United States Military Academy alumni
United States National Security Advisors
University of North Carolina at Chapel Hill alumni
Valley Forge Military Academy and College alumni
United States Army personnel of the Gulf War
United States Military Academy faculty
Historians from Pennsylvania
Recipients of the Meritorious Service Medal (United States)
Recipients of the Humanitarian Service Medal
Foreign Policy Research Institute